Romayor is an unincorporated community in Liberty County, Texas, United States.  According to the Handbook of Texas, the community had an estimated population of 96 in 2000.

Romayor is located at the junction of Farm to Market roads 787 and 2610, sixty-three miles northwest of Beaumont in northern Liberty County.

Education 

Romayor is zoned to schools in the Hardin Independent School District.

Climate
The climate in this area is characterized by hot, humid summers and generally mild to cool winters.  According to the Köppen Climate Classification system, Romayor has a humid subtropical climate, abbreviated "Cfa" on climate maps.

References

External links 

 

Unincorporated communities in Liberty County, Texas
Unincorporated communities in Texas